{{Infobox boxing match
| Fight Name    = Think Fast!
| fight date    = February 19, 2011
| image         =  
| location      = Mandalay Bay Resort & Casino, Las Vegas, Nevada, US
| fighter1      = Fernando Montiel 
| nickname1     = Cochulito
| record1       = 44-2-2 (34 KO)
|weight1 = 118 lb
| hometown1     = Los Mochis, Sinaloa, Mexico
| height1       = 5 ft 4 in 
| recognition1  = WBC and WBO bantamweight champion[[The Ring (magazine)|The Ring]] No. 7 ranked pound-for-pound fighter3-division world champion
|style1 = Orthodox
| fighter2      =  Nonito Donaire
| nickname2     = The Filipino Flash
| record2       = 25-1 (17 KO)
| hometown2     = Talibon, Bohol, Philippines
| height2       = 5 ft 6 in 
|weight2 = 118 lb
|style2 = Orthodox
| recognition2  = The Ring No. 5 ranked pound-for-pound fighterFormer flyweight champion
| titles        = WBC and WBO bantamweight titles
| result        = Donaire wins via 2nd–round TKO
}}

Fernando Montiel vs. Nonito Donaire, billed as Think Fast!, was a bantamweight world title fight, which pitted 2 fighters both on [[Ring Magazine pound for pound|The Rings Top 10 pound-for-pound list]].

The fight
Donaire rocked Montiel with a left hook that sent the champion to the canvas. He was able to make it to his feet and allowed to continue, but after two more punches from Donaire, the referee stepped in and waved an end to the bout at 2:25 of Round 2. Donaire controlled most of the first round, landing a left hook that briefly stunned Montiel and came out swinging in the second round, landing a few combinations before stunning the champion with a solid hook that all but ended the fight.

Undercard

TelevisedBantamweight Unified Championship bout:  Fernando Montiel (c)   vs.  Nonito Donaire
Donaire defeats Montiel by TKO at 2:25 in round 2.Welterweight bout:  Mike Jones  vs.  Jesús Soto Karass
Jones defeats Karass by unanimous decision.Welterweight bout:  Mark Jason Melligen  vs.  Gabriel Martinez
Melligen defeats Martinez by unanimous decision.Welterweight bout:  Mike Alvarado  vs.  Dean Harrison
Alvarado defeats Harrison via RTD at 3:00 of round 4.Light Welterweight bout:  Mickey Bey, Jr.  vs.  Jose Hernandez
Fight ends in a drawWelterweight bout:  Yordenis Ugás  vs.  Carlos Musquez
Ugas defeats Musquez by unanimous decision.Welterweight bout:  Rodrigo García  vs.  Gerald Jordan
Garcia defeats Jordan by unanimous decision.Welterweight bout: ''' Ignacio Garcia  vs.  Armando Dorantes
Garcia defeats Majority by unanimous decision.

References

External links
HBO

Boxing matches
2011 in boxing
Boxing in Las Vegas
2011 in sports in Nevada
Boxing on HBO
February 2011 sports events in the United States